David Belove is an American Afro-Cuban and Brazilian jazz bass guitarist based in the San Francisco Bay Area. He was born in Kansas City and relocated to California in the early 1980's. He studied at San Francisco State University and at the San Francisco Conservatory of Music. Belove has recorded and toured with Pete and Sheila Escovedo, Tito Puente, the Machete Ensemble, Rebeca Mauleon-Santana, Claudia Villela, and Oscar Castro-Neves. He has also worked with jazz artists Joe Henderson, Max Roach, Dizzy Gillespie, and many others. Belove's work in music education includes playing bass on the Salsa and Latin Jazz, Volume 74 of the Jamey Aebersold's "Play-A-Long" series, and he currently conducts classes in Afro-Cuban jazz ensemble at the Jazzschool in Berkeley, California.

He has been nominated for several Grammy Awards as part of the Wayne Wallace Latin Jazz Quintet. He was featured in the documentary The Last Mambo.

References

American jazz bass guitarists
People from the Kansas City metropolitan area
Living people
Afro-Cuban jazz guitarists
Brazilian jazz (genre) guitarists
Year of birth missing (living people)